Sir Graham Vick  (30 December 1953 – 17 July 2021) was an English opera director known for his experimental and revisionist stagings of traditional and modern operas. He worked in many of the world's leading opera houses and was artistic director of the Birmingham Opera Company.

Life and career
Vick was born on 30 December 1953 in Birkenhead, the youngest son of Arnold and Muriel (née Hynes) Vick. He studied at the Royal Northern College of Music in Manchester. At age 24, he directed a production of Gustav Holst's Savitri for the Scottish Opera, and became the company's director of productions in 1984. From 1994 to 2000, Vick was director of productions at Glyndebourne Opera.

In 1987, he founded the Birmingham Opera Company and remained its artistic director. Vick's productions with Birmingham Opera included the first UK production of Othello to feature a black tenor in the title role in 2009, and the 2012 world premiere of Karlheinz Stockhausen's notoriously difficult .

Vick died from complications arising from COVID-19 on 17 July 2021, aged 67.

Honours and awards
In 2005, the National Portrait Gallery, London acquired a portrait of Vick by the photographer Lorentz Gullachsen. Vick was awarded as Knight of the French , as Honorary Professor of Music at the University of Birmingham, and as International Chair of Opera at the Royal Northern College of Music. He was also awarded Honorary Membership of the Royal Philharmonic Society in 2016. Vick was appointed Commander of the Order of the British Empire (CBE) in the 2009 Birthday Honours and knighted in the 2021 New Year Honours for services to music and the regions.

Recordings 

Many of Vick's productions can be seen on DVD including Lulu (Glyndebourne, 2004) Warner Music Vision B000189L10, and Falstaff (Covent Garden, 2001) Opus Arte B00005NUP8.

References

Sources 
 Millington, Barry, "Vick, Graham"  in The New Grove Dictionary of Opera, ed. Stanley Sadie (London, 1992) 
 Jasper Rees, 'La traviata: A Nuremberg-style display of synchronised chair-swivelling', The Daily Telegraph, 25 October 2007 
 Edward Rothstein, 'In New Hall, Echoes of Glyndebourne Old', New York Times, 4 June 1994 
 Martin Bernheimer, 'Living Dangerously' (Profile of Graham Vick), Opera News, June 2000 
 Hamilton, Mary. (1990). A-Z of Opera. New York, Oxford, Sydney: Facts On File. p. 212. .
 Sadie, Stanley and John Tyrrell. (2001). The New Grove Dictionary of Music and Musicians. London: Macmillan Publishers Ltd. Vol. 26, p. 530. .
 Warrack, John, and Ewan West. (1996 3rd ed.). The Concise Oxford Dictionary of Opera. New York: Oxford University Press. p. 538. .

External links 
 Birmingham Opera Company biography 
 
 
 

1953 births
2021 deaths
British opera directors
Commanders of the Order of the British Empire
People educated at Birkenhead School
Alumni of the Royal Northern College of Music
Knights Bachelor
Deaths from the COVID-19 pandemic in England
People from Birkenhead